Mount Afton is a  mountain summit located in Glacier National Park in the Selkirk Mountains of British Columbia, Canada.

The first ascent of the mountain was made in 1893 by Herbert Lambert, Miss MacLeod, Harold A. Perley, William H. Rau, and William Stables via the east buttress.

The mountain was climbed in 1895 via the south ridge by Philip Stanley Abbot, Charles Ernest Fay, and Charles S. Thompson who named the mountain after themselves using an amalgamation of letters from their surnames, ("A"bbot "F"ay "T"homps"on").

The mountain's name was officially adopted March 31, 1924, when approved by the Geographical Names Board of Canada.

Climate

Based on the Köppen climate classification, Mount Afton is located in a subarctic climate zone with cold, snowy winters, and mild summers.

See also

Geography of British Columbia

References

External links
 Weather: Mount Afton

Selkirk Mountains
Glacier National Park (Canada)
Columbia Country
Two-thousanders of British Columbia
Kootenay Land District